Nawapol Tantraseni (born March 9, 1989) is a professional footballer from Thailand.

Honours

Club
Chonburi 
 Thailand Premier League Champions (1) : 2007

Muangthong United
 Thai Premier League Champions (2) : 2009, 2010
 Kor Royal Cup winner (1) : 2010

References

External links
 Goal.com
 

1989 births
Living people
Nawapol Tantraseni
Nawapol Tantraseni
Association football utility players
Nawapol Tantraseni
Nawapol Tantraseni
Nawapol Tantraseni
Nawapol Tantraseni
Nawapol Tantraseni
Nawapol Tantraseni
Nawapol Tantraseni
Nawapol Tantraseni
Nawapol Tantraseni
Nawapol Tantraseni
Nawapol Tantraseni
Association football central defenders
Association football midfielders